Montrose is a town in Laurens County, Georgia, United States. The population was 215 at the 2010 census, up from 154 in 2000. It is part of the Dublin Micropolitan Statistical Area.

History
The Georgia General Assembly incorporated Montrose as a town in 1929.

Geography
Montrose is located at  (32.558253, -83.152311).

Montrose is US Route 80 at the junction of State Highway 278 and is north of Interstate 16.

Demographics

At the 2000 census, there were 154 people, 55 households and 44 families residing in the town. The racial makeup of the town was 57.79% White, 40.91% African American, 0.65% Native American, and 0.65% from two or more races. Hispanic or Latino of any race were 0.65% of the population.

There were 55 households, of which 38.2% had children under the age of 18 living with them, 58.2% were married couples living together, 12.7% had a female householder with no husband present, and 18.2% were non-families. 16.4% of all households were made up of individuals, and 12.7% had someone living alone who was 65 years of age or older. The average household size was 2.80 and the average family size was 3.13.

28.6% of the population were under the age of 18, 6.5% from 18 to 24, 26.0% from 25 to 44, 25.3% from 45 to 64, and 13.6% who were 65 years of age or older. The median age was 38 years. For every 100 females, there were 77.0 males. For every 100 females age 18 and over, there were 80.3 males.

The median household income was $46,563, and the median family income was $56,250. Males had a median income of $30,893 versus $18,750 for females. The per capita income for the town was $14,504. About 2.4% of families and 11.2% of the population were below the poverty line, including 30.4% of those under the age of eighteen and 14.3% of those 65 or over.

Notable people

 Jeralean Talley
 Demaryius Thomas

References

Towns in Laurens County, Georgia
Towns in Georgia (U.S. state)
Dublin, Georgia micropolitan area